is an island in Hyōgo Prefecture, Japan, in the eastern part of the Seto Inland Sea between the islands of Honshū and Shikoku. It is the largest island of the Seto Inland Sea.

As a transit between those two islands, Awaji originally means "the road to Awa", the historic province bordering the Shikoku side of the Naruto Strait, now part of Tokushima Prefecture.

Geography

The island is separated from Honshū by the Akashi Strait and from Shikoku by the Naruto Strait. Since April 5, 1998, it has been connected to Kobe on Honshū by the Akashi Kaikyō Bridge, the longest suspension bridge in the world. Since its completion the Kobe-Awaji-Naruto Expressway across the island has been the main eastern land link between Honshū and Shikoku. The Naruto whirlpools form in the strait between Naruto, Tokushima and Awaji.

The Nojima Fault, responsible for the 1995 Great Hanshin earthquake, cuts across the island. Outside of this protected area, the fault zone is less visible. 

History
According to the creation myth in Shinto, Awaji was the first of the ōyashima islands born from the kami Izanagi and Izanami. Awaji constituted a province between the 7th and the 19th century, Awaji Province, and was a part of Nankaidō. Today the island consists of three municipalities: Awaji, Sumoto and Minamiawaji.

The Awaji puppets perform popular traditional dramas but have their origins in religious rituals.

Starting in the 1830s, the local potter Minpei started producing what would be then known as Awaji ware, also known as Minpei ware.

In 1995, this island was the epicenter of the Kobe earthquake, which killed over 5,502 people.

Municipalities
There are 3 municipalities in Awaji island: Awaji, Sumoto and Minamiawaji. They are part of Hyogo Prefecture.

Gallery

See also

Thirteen Buddhas of Awaji Island

References

External links

  Awaji website of Hyōgo prefecture
  Awaji Island Tourist Association
  Awaji Island Portal

Islands of Hyōgo Prefecture
Kansai region
Islands of the Seto Inland Sea